Gale Anne Hurd (born October 25, 1955) is an American film and television producer, the founder of Valhalla Entertainment (formerly Pacific Western Productions), and a former recording secretary for the Producers Guild of America.

Early life

Hurd was born in Los Angeles, the daughter of Lolita (née Espiau) and Frank E. Hurd, an investor. Her father was Jewish, and her mother was  Catholic. She grew up in Palm Springs, California and graduated from Palm Springs High School in 1973. She graduated from Stanford University with a BA in economics and communications, and a minor in political science, in 1977.

Film career
She joined New World Pictures as executive assistant to Roger Corman, the company president. She worked her way up through various administrative positions and eventually became involved in production. She formed her own production company, Pacific Western Productions, in 1982 and went on to produce a number of box-office hits including the James Cameron films The Terminator (1984, the screenplay for which she co-wrote with Cameron, her sole screenwriting credit), Aliens (1986), and The Abyss (1989).

In 1998, she was awarded the Women in Film Crystal Award for outstanding women who, through their endurance and the excellence of their work, have helped to expand the role of women within the entertainment industry.

In 2003, she was awarded the Telluride Tech Festival Award of Technology at Telluride, Colorado, along with Arthur C. Clarke.

In 2010, the drama series she produced, The Walking Dead, began airing on AMC.

Hurd became a governor of the Academy of Motion Picture Arts and Sciences in 2011.

On October 3, 2012, she was awarded a star on the Hollywood Walk of Fame.

In 2013, Hurd was awarded the Laura Ziskin Lifetime Achievement Award from the Athena Film Festival, at Barnard College in New York City. The award honors her as a woman in the film industry whose leadership demonstrates vision and courage and sets a standard for other women to emulate.

Hurd was awarded the Fangoria Lifetime Achievement Award in 2017 for her body of work in the horror and science fiction genres.

Personal life
Hurd was married to James Cameron from 1985 to 1989; to director Brian De Palma from 1991 to 1993, with whom she had one daughter, Lolita de Palma, in 1991; and to screenwriter/director Jonathan Hensleigh since 1995.

Filmography

Television

References

External links

 
 Official Twitter page
 Official company website 

1955 births
20th-century American screenwriters
20th-century American women writers
Film producers from California
American people of Jewish descent
Screenwriters from California
Television producers from California
American women television producers
American women screenwriters
Living people
Stanford University alumni
American women film producers
Writers from Los Angeles
21st-century American women